The Dong Feng 31 (NATO reporting name CSS-10) is a third-generation long-range, road-mobile, three stage, solid-fuel rocket intercontinental ballistic missile (ICBM) in the Dongfeng missile series developed by the People's Republic of China.  It is designed to carry a single 1-megaton thermonuclear weapon.  It is a land-based variant of the submarine-launched JL-2.  It is operated by the Second Artillery Corps (SAC) which, in 2009, was estimated to have under 15 DF-31 missiles and under 15 DF-31A missiles in inventory.  US Air Force National Air and Space Intelligence Center estimates that as of June 2017, five to ten Mod 1 and over fifteen Mod 2 launchers were operationally deployed.

History
The PRC began developing the DF-31 ICBM in January 1985. ARMT (then called the 4th Aerospace Academy) was appointed as the main contractor while the research arm of the Second Artillery Corps provided contributing support. The land-based variant of the JL-2 was originally called the DF-23 but was changed later on to the DF-31 because of a change in operational requirements. In 1999, the missile was first displayed publicly at the National Day Parade. On August 2, 1999, the Chinese state news media reported the successful test of the DF-31. The third test flight of the missile occurred on November 4, 2000; the second test flight had taken place earlier that year. Operational deployment of the missiles reportedly began in 2006. In 2009, US Air Force Intelligence reported that under 15 DF-31 missiles had been deployed.

Description
The DF-31 is a three stage solid-fuel rocket equipped with an inertial navigation system. The missile is mounted on a transporter erector launcher. It is capable of reaching targets throughout Europe, Asia, and parts of Canada and the northwestern United States.

DF-31A
The PRC has developed an improved variant of the DF-31 called the DF-31A.  This upgraded missile has a reported range of 11,200 km, will allow targeting of most of the continental United States and was designed with MIRV capability to hold 3 to 5 warheads, each capable of a 20–150 kt yield, but is thought to be armed with only one warhead with penetration and decoy aids to complicate missile defense efforts.
The missile was shown to the public during the parade in Beijing celebrating 70 years since the end of World War II on September 3, 2015. It can carry maneuverable reentry vehicles.

DF-31AG/DF-31B
The PRC has developed an improved variant of the DF-31A called the DF-31AG (G stands for 改 (Gaï), "modified)  or DF-31B with an off-road 8 axle TEL and MIRVs. China has successfully tested it from a mobile launcher. The missile's TEL features an extra pair of elevators near the aft of the missile unlike the TELs of the DF-31 or DF-31A, suggesting a heavier missile second and third stage than earlier variants. On the military parade marking the 90th Anniversary of the founding of the People’s Liberation Army in 2017, DF-31AG ICBM was officially demonstrated.

References

Further reading

External links
 CSIS Missile Threat - Dong Feng-31
 Encyclopedia Astronautica

Intercontinental ballistic missiles of the People's Republic of China
Nuclear missiles of the People's Republic of China
Military equipment introduced in the 2000s